Oh My Lord may refer to:
"Oh My Lord," a song by Nick Cave and the Bad Seeds from their 2001 album No More Shall We Part
"Oh My Lord," a song by Boney M.
"Oh My Lord," a song by Ringo Starr from his 2005 album Choose Love
"Oh My Lord," a song by Randy Bachman from his 2015 album Heavy Blues

See also
Oh Lord (disambiguation)